Patrick Leopold Martin (1830 – 29 October 1895), was an Irish politician in the United Kingdom House of Commons.

He was elected to the United Kingdom House of Commons as Member of Parliament for County Kilkenny in 1874, and held the seat until the constituency was divided for the 1885 general election.

References

External links 
 

    
    
    

1830 births
1895 deaths
Politicians from County Kilkenny
19th-century Irish people
Members of the Parliament of the United Kingdom for County Kilkenny constituencies (1801–1922)
UK MPs 1874–1880
UK MPs 1880–1885